Nelle Brooke Stull of Elyria, Ohio was founder and president of the Widows' & Widowers' Club, which introduced bereaved men and women to each other in hope of making new matches. "I am the love fixer. I make men and women happy. My theory is that every Jill has her Jack," said Stull. (Time magazine, 12 November 1934)

References

People from Elyria, Ohio
Dating
Matchmakers

Activists from Ohio